The women's middleweight (60 kg/132 lbs) K-1 category at the W.A.K.O. World Championships 2007 in Belgrade was the third lightest of the female K-1 tournaments.  There were five women from two continents (Europe and Africa) taking part in the competition.  Each of the matches was three rounds of two minutes each and were fought under K-1 rules.  

As there were not enough fighters for an eight-person tournament, three of the women had byes through to the semi finals.  The tournament was won by Alena Muratava from Belarus who defeated Kseniya Belskaya from Russia in the final to win gold.  Serbia's Suzana Radovanovic and Italy's Paola Cappucci won bronze medals for reaching the semi finals.

Results

See also
List of WAKO Amateur World Championships
List of WAKO Amateur European Championships
List of female kickboxers

References

External links
 WAKO World Association of Kickboxing Organizations Official Site

Kickboxing events at the WAKO World Championships 2007 Belgrade
2007 in kickboxing
Kickboxing in Serbia